Zhang Chi  may refer to:

 Zhang Chi (scholar) (1133–1180), Ming Dynasty Confucian scholar
 Zhang Chi (footballer) (b. 1987), Chinese football player